Nasi goreng jawa (Indonesian for Javanese fried rice, Javanese: sega goreng jawa) is a Javanese-style of fried rice originated from Java, Indonesia. This dish can be found in Javanese cuisine and quite popular in Indonesia, especially Java. Commonly, this rice dish uses sambal ulek as seasoning and has a spicy taste.

Variation 
 Nasi goreng babat from Semarang which is slightly brown in color with tripe as a side dish.
 Nasi goreng Solo (Central Java) which is pink in color with a side dish of cabbage and shredded free-range chicken.
 Nasi goreng Surabaya which is red-brown in color, the portion is large, and slightly spicy with a side dish of sliced omelet and chicken.
 Nasi goreng kampung from Yogyakarta which is red in color with side dishes of sunny-side up eggs and free-range chicken.

See also
 Fried rice
 List of fried rice dishes
 Cuisine of Indonesia
 Nasi goreng
 Nasi goreng pattaya
 Nasi minyak
 Java Rice

References

External links

Fried rice
Indonesian rice dishes
Javanese cuisine
Street food in Indonesia